Min Sanay  (Arakanese: မင်းစနဲ), was a king of the Mrauk-U Dynasty of Arakan. When Thiri Thudhamma died on May 18, 1638, Min Sanay succeeded the throne. After ascending the throne, Min Sanay suffered from smallpox and his mother Nat Shin Mae advised him to move to "Winzama" , northeast of Mrauk U, for a short period of time to cure his disease. Min Sanay followed the advice of his mother and moved to Winzama. There, he was poisoned to death by his own mother Nat Shin Mae. He ruled the kingdom only 20 days. After the death of Min Sanay, Nat Shin Mae enthroned her secret lover Ngakuthala (Narapati). Many nobles who disagreed her were murdered and some escaped.

References

(1) A history of Rakhineland in brief By Aung Hla Thein

(2) New Arakanese chronicle By Ven. Candamālālaṇkāra

Bibliography
 
 
 
 

Monarchs of Mrauk-U
17th century in Burma
17th-century Burmese monarchs